Damien Cely (born 13 April 1989 in Sarcelles) is a French diver. He competed in the 3 m springboard event at the 2012 Summer Olympics.

References

External links 
 
 
 

1989 births
Living people
French male divers
Olympic divers of France
Divers at the 2012 Summer Olympics
People from Sarcelles
Sportspeople from Val-d'Oise
21st-century French people